Mountelgonia urundiensis is a moth of the family Cossidae. It is found on the high central plateau of Burundi. The habitat consists of forest/woodland mosaic with riverine forests at high elevations.

The wingspan is about 21 mm. The forewings are warm buff, the costal margin with sepia. The hindwings are glossy ivory yellow, with slightly darker veins.

Etymology
The species name is derived from Urundi, the name of Burundi before the country gained independence in 1962.

References

Moths described in 2013
Mountelgonia
Moths of Africa